The El Paso Generals were a professional indoor football team that played in the Indoor Football League in the 2009 season.  Based in El Paso, Texas, the Generals played their home games at the El Paso County Coliseum.  The Generals were the first indoor football team in El Paso since the charter Intense Football League member the El Paso Rumble folded following their only season in 2004 and had finished 0–16.

History
In 2011, former general manager, Dart Clark, tried to revive the Generals franchise, but it never came to fruition.

Season records

References

External links
El Paso Generals (under construction)
El Paso Times story announcing Generals' name & logo

Former Indoor Football League teams
American football teams in El Paso, Texas
Defunct American football teams in Texas
American football teams established in 2009
American football teams disestablished in 2009
2009 establishments in Texas
2009 disestablishments in Texas